The 2009–10 All-Ireland Junior Club Hurling Championship was the seventh staging of the All-Ireland Junior Club Hurling Championship since its establishment by the Gaelic Athletic Association.

The All-Ireland final was played on 13 February 2010 at Croke Park in Dublin, between Blackrock from Limerick and Naomh Colum Cille from Tyrone, in what was their first ever meeting in the final. Blackrock won the match by 1-18 to 0-09 to claim their first ever championship title.

Connacht Junior Club Hurling Championship

Connacht final

Leinster Junior Club Hurling Championship

Leinster final

Munster Junior Club Hurling Championship

Munster quarter-final

Munster semi-finals

Munster final

Ulster Junior Club Hurling Championship

Ulster final

All-Ireland Junior Club Hurling Championship

All-Ireland quarter-final

All-Ireland semi-finals

All-Ireland final

Championship statistics

Miscellaneous

 Calry/St Joseph's  became the first Sligo club to win a provincial title in any grade
 Blacks and Whites became the first club to win two Leinster Championship titles.

References

All-Ireland Junior Club Hurling Championship
All-Ireland Junior Club Hurling Championship
All-Ireland Junior Club Hurling Championship